Jimmy Neutron's Nicktoon Blast was a simulator ride at Universal Studios Florida that replaced The Funtastic World of Hanna-Barbera based on the 2001 movie Jimmy Neutron: Boy Genius and it is set to take place after the events of the film. The story line revolved around Ooblar, (brother to King Goobot who is an arch-enemy of Jimmy's) from the Yolkian planet that has stolen Jimmy's newest rocket creation, the Mark IV.  Jimmy, along with his best friend Carl and robot dog, Goddard, invite the audience to give chase in other rockets through the worlds and sound stages of the Nicktoons.

On March 14, 2011, Universal announced that the attraction would begin operating on a seasonal schedule starting on April 1, 2011, and would operate for limited amounts of time throughout the spring and summer seasons before it closed completely on August 18, 2011. Jimmy Neutron's Nicktoon Blast was replaced by Despicable Me Minion Mayhem on July 2, 2012.

Plot

Queue 
While in the queue line, there were TV screens that played various videos that the guests could watch. These included the rules of the attraction (given by a Nicktoons character), clips from various Nicktoon shows, Nickelodeon IDs, and a sneak peek preview of the ride via clips from the original Jimmy Neutron movie. For the final months of the ride's operation, some of the Nicktoons clips would be swapped out with music videos for currently airing Nickelodeon shows such as Victorious and Big Time Rush.

Pre-show 
After a Universal Studios crew member directs riders into a briefing room, Jimmy Neutron welcomes the riders and, with help from Carl Wheezer, unveils his newest invention: the Mark IV rocket. Shortly afterwards, Ooblar breaks into the lab so he can return Carl's teddy bear. Next, he plays a recording from his brother, King Goobot, who tells Jimmy he plans to duplicate the rocket for his armies which will allow him to enslave the earth, Ooblar then claims the Mark IV in the name of Yolkus, grabs the remote for it, and flies off. Quickly, Jimmy announces that he and Carl will follow Ooblar in their Mark II rocket, while the riders will follow in the original (and slightly unpredictable) Mark I rockets. He assures everyone that he will safely pilot the riders by remote, right before it shorts circuits and causes a black-out, ending the pre-show  with the lab doors opening and a crew member ushering the riders into the rockets and delivering safety instructions.

Ride 
Carl nervously counts down from 10 for the launch to begin the ride, but Jimmy interrupts him by starting the rockets and leaving the lab. They make chase for Ooblar through the sound stages, passing various Nicktoons characters along the way. Ooblar leads them first through Hillwood then to the Rugrats' home, with the Mark I rockets almost running into Angelica by accident. However, Goddard pulls her out of the way just in time using his robot claw. They leave the soundstage and make way for Fairy World, where Cosmo offers Carl his wand as assistance. The dumbstruck Carl accidentally poofs Ooblar away so Wanda poofs the rockets (and their passengers) to the Yolkian planet, sending the rockets crashing through the planet's capital city. The chase ends with Jimmy, Carl, and the riders trapped in King Goobot's throne room, where they are confronted by Poultra. They barely escape after Poultra's breath fries Ooblar and destroys the Mark IV, when the engines on the Mark II and Mark I rockets fail, so Carl, using Cosmo's wand, poofs everyone (Yolkians excluded) back to Earth, where they plummet into Bikini Bottom. SpongeBob, mistaking the Mark II for a jellyfish, ensnares Jimmy in his jellyfishing net, blinding the pilot and sending everyone crashing through downtown, ending with the Mark II and Mark I rockets going through a drain pipe leading back to Jimmy's lab. Just when everyone thinks they're safe, King Goobot barges in, trapping Jimmy and using the pilot remote to make the ride vehicles do the chicken dance. Carl, realizing that he still has Cosmo's wand, sends out a laser blast that flies over the riders and cracks the king. The ride ends with Carl poofing up a bunch of llamas and Jimmy wishing everyone farewell. Then, the door with the large letter "N" closes, ending the ride, and the attendants congratulate the riders on a job well done.

Post-show 
After the ride, the guests went into a play area/store known as Nickstuff. There, the guests played interactive games and saw exhibits from Nickelodeon Studios' history as well as shop for Nickelodeon merchandise. There was also a character meet and greet with SpongeBob and an interactive television camera that guests played with. In the attraction's earlier days, Jimmy Neutron made character appearances with SpongeBob. Music from different Nickelodeon shows plus Nickelodeon channel identification spots were played while the guests played or shopped.

In June 2008, the signs from older Nickelodeon shows were taken away and were replaced with signs from newer Nickelodeon shows such as The Naked Brothers Band and iCarly, due to Nickelodeon Studios having closed in 2005.

Voice cast and crew
 Debi Derryberry as Jimmy Neutron
 Rob Paulsen as Carl
 Frank Welker as Goddard
 S. Scott Bullock as King Goobot
 Cheryl Chase as Angelica Pickles
 Daran Norris as Cosmo
 Susanne Blakeslee as Wanda
 Tom Kenny as SpongeBob
 Bill Fagerbakke as Patrick Star
 Clancy Brown as Mr. Krabs

Crew
 Directed by - Mario Kamberg
 Produced by - Kevin Susman, Joel Krasnove
 Art Directed by - Allen Battino
 CG Visual Effects Designed by - Donny Sorvala, Trey Stokes, Robert J. Baldwin, Christopher Lee Fowler, Heather Davis Baker
 Music Composed by - James S. Levine
 Computer Animation by DNA Productions, Inc.
 Computer Animation Systems by Silicon Graphics, Alias/Wavefront, Softimage 3D, Lightwave 3D, messiah:studio, Sun Microsystems
 2D Animation Production by - Klasky/Csupo, Inc.
 Directing Animator: John Sore
 Animator: Jason Meier
 Production Manager - Julie Peng
 Distributed by - Universal Studios

History 
The Funtastic World of Hanna-Barbera was one of Universal Studios Florida's original attractions, opening with the park on June 7, 1990. In 1998, Universal officials noticed that the ride had lost a large percentage of its operating capacity, most likely due to declining interest in the featured Hanna-Barbera cartoons, and they secretly began work on a new attraction to replace it with which would be based on more recent cartoons rather than older animation. Universal then brought up the idea of opening a Nickelodeon themed simulator ride.

In the early 2000s, a contract was granted with Viacom and Nickelodeon to replace "Hanna-Barbera" with a simulator ride titled "The Nicktoon Blast". In 2001, it was decided the newest Nicktoon character Jimmy Neutron would host the ride, and it was secretly greenlit as "Jimmy Neutron Adventure". Production on the ride film and conceptual art of the new look for the ride was done in 2001 through very early 2003.

On May 19, 2002, Universal officially confirmed that they would not renew their contract for the Hanna-Barbera ride and that it would be replaced by "Jimmy Neutron Adventure" (renamed to "Jimmy Neutron's Nicktoon Blast" by January 2003) in Spring 2003. They had also announced the replacement of Alfred Hitchcock: The Art of Making Movies with Shrek 4-D on the same day.

Production 

Unlike the ride film of "The Funtastic World of Hanna-Barbera" which Universal had co-produced with Hanna-Barbera Productions, the ride film of Jimmy Neutron's Nicktoon Blast was created solely by Nickelodeon Animation Studios with Viacom Productions as the distributor, and the only involvement which Universal Studios had in production of the ride film was an appearance of the Universal logo on the character Ooblar's hat during the pre-show portion. However, Mario Kamberg, Allen Battino and Totally Fun Company's  Trey Stokes, who designed the ride film for "Hanna-Barbera", also signed on to take part in the animation of the Nicktoon Blast ride film. The reason for which "Hanna-Barbera" needed a contract as well despite Universal still in ownership of the ride film was due to the fact that Universal did not own the characters and needed a license to use them at their theme parks.

"The Funtastic World of Hanna-Barbera" closed on October 20, 2002, and construction began almost immediately afterwards. The rebuilding of "Hanna-Barbera" into "Jimmy Neutron" lasted 5 months and two weeks, currently the second shortest ride turn around in Universal Orlando Resort's history behind the change from Earthquake: The Big One to Disaster!. The attraction started previews in late March 2003 known as "Technical Reheasals". The ride was officially opened by Universal Orlando on April 11.

Closing 
On March 14, 2011, Universal Orlando released this statement via their Facebook page:

The attraction began operating only during peak seasons on April 1, 2011. It remained operating in the seasonal schedule until closing on August 18. On May 19, 2011, Universal Orlando officially announced that the Despicable Me Minion Mayhem would be based on the movie franchise Despicable Me and was opened in July 2012. As of 2020, while there are no Nickelodeon attractions currently operating at the Universal Studios theme parks, their locations in Florida and California still sell merchandise and offer meet and greets with characters from Nickelodeon franchises such as SpongeBob SquarePants, Dora the Explorer, and Diego.

Reception 
The website Orlando Rocks gave a positive review stating "Move over Hanna!  This ride is wonderful".

The ride received a 7 out of 10 rating on the website Theme Park Insider. On IMDB, it received a 6 out of 10 star rating. Comparingly, the Hanna-Barbera ride received an 8 out of 10 rating.

See also 
 2011 in amusement parks
 List of amusement rides based on television franchises

References

External links 
 Jimmy Neutron's Nicktoon Blast at Universal Orlando Resort 
 Jimmy Neutron's Nicktoon Blast at Orlando Rocks
 
 Universalignited.com

Simulator rides
The Adventures of Jimmy Neutron, Boy Genius
Crossover fiction
Amusement rides introduced in 2003
Nickelodeon in amusement parks
Universal Parks & Resorts films
Amusement rides that closed in 2011
Universal Studios Florida
Former Universal Studios Florida attractions
Universal Parks & Resorts attractions by name
Licensed properties at Universal Parks & Resorts
Amusement rides manufactured by Intamin
Amusement rides based on television franchises
Amusement rides based on film franchises
2000s animated short films
Computer-animated short films
American animated short films
2000s American animated films
2003 establishments in Florida
2011 disestablishments in Florida